"Demolition Man" is a song written by Sting and performed by Grace Jones as the A-side of a 1981 single. Sting's band, the Police, later released their rendition of the song on their album Ghost in the Machine.

Background
The song was originally written by Sting in the Summer of 1980 while living in Peter O’Toole’s home in Connemara, Ireland for potential use on The Police’s Zenyatta Mondatta, but they never managed to get around to recording it. A demo was sent to Grace Jones when she requested Sting for a song.

The lyric "I'm a three-line whip", often assumed to be a reference to sadomasochism, is in fact an allusion to the voting instructions issued to British members of parliament to cast their votes according to the party line.  Sting explained this in an interview: "Whatever party's in power in Parliament, if it's a really important vote, you get a one-line whip. If it's incredibly important, you have a two-line whip, and something monumentally important is a three-line whip." According to Sting, he never knew that his A-level in British Constitution would "bear fruit in a rock and roll lyric".

Grace Jones version
"Demolition Man" was released as the lead single from Grace Jones's 1981 album Nightclubbing. The song was performed on A One Man Show tour, featuring marching "Joneses" (stand-ins wearing Grace Jones masks), and included in the documentary film. A still picture from the video was later used for the cover of 1982 singles "Nipple to the Bottle" and "The Apple Stretching".

Track listing
7" single
A. "Demolition Man" – 3:31
B. "Warm Leatherette" – 4:25

12" single
A. "Demolition Man" – 4:56
B. "Bullshit" – 5:18

The Police version

Soon after Jones released her version as a single, the Police recorded their own version for their 1981 album, Ghost in the Machine. Guitarist Andy Summers recalls:

The Police recorded the song in a jazzy hard rock style, featuring a guitar solo by Andy Summers. Sting's roadie Danny Quatrochi played the bass.

Personnel
Sting – vocals, saxophone
Andy Summers – guitars
Stewart Copeland – drums
Danny Quatrochi - bass (uncredited)

Use in popular culture and other media
 "Demolition Man" was performed by Sting many times during his solo career and released in 1993 on an EP of the same name in support of the film Demolition Man; this version of the song plays during the end credits.
 In "True Crime", the 53rd episode of Beavis and Butt-head, aired in 1993, the pair were watching Jones' video for "Demolition Man" within A One Man Show.
 A live version of "Demolition Man", performed by Sting and recorded at Irving Plaza in 2005, was featured in the game Guitar Hero World Tour along with an in-game representation of Sting himself, which becomes an unlockable character upon completing the song in the bass career. This recording was later remixed and released on Sting's compilation The Best of 25 Years. 
 An excerpt of Jones' performance of the song from A One Man Show was displayed as a part of the Postmodernism: Style and Subversion 1970-1990 temporary exhibition at London's Victoria and Albert Museum in 2011 and 2012.
 "Demolition Man" was included on the 1984 live album Budapest Live by Manfred Mann's Earth Band,  and previously on their 1983 studio album Somewhere in Afrika

References

1981 singles
Grace Jones songs
The Police songs
Songs about fictional male characters
Songs written by Sting (musician)
1981 songs
Island Records singles
Song recordings produced by Alex Sadkin